East Juliette is an unincorporated community in Jones County, in the U.S. state of Georgia.

History
East Juliette was an incorporated municipality from 1924 until 1995. The community was named from its location east of Juliette, Georgia. Variant names were "Glovers" and "Glovers Mill".

References

Unincorporated communities in Jones County, Georgia